The Federal Correctional Institution, Allenwood Medium (FCI Allenwood Medium) is a medium-security United States federal prison for male inmates in Gregg Township, Union County, Pennsylvania. It is part of the Allenwood Federal Correctional Complex (FCC Allenwood) and is operated by the Federal Bureau of Prisons, a division of the United States Department of Justice.

FCC Allenwood is located approximately 75 miles north of Harrisburg, Pennsylvania, the state capital.

Notable inmates (current and former)

See also
Federal Correctional Institution, Allenwood Low
List of U.S. federal prisons
Federal Bureau of Prisons
Incarceration in the United States

References

External links
FCI Allenwood Medium - Federal Bureau of Prisons

Buildings and structures in Lycoming County, Pennsylvania
Allenwood Medium
Allenwood Medium